The Elon Public Library is a historic public library building at Camden and Younger Drives in Amherst, Virginia.  It is a modest vernacular single story wood-frame structure with a gabled roof.  It was built in 1918, and was the Amherst County's first rural free library.  It served as a lending library for the surrounding area until 1965, as well as a community meeting space and polling place.  It was closed when the county dedicated a portion of the nearby school for use as a public library.

The building was added to the National Register of Historic Places in 2016.

See also
 National Register of Historic Places listings in Amherst County, Virginia

References

Buildings and structures in Amherst County, Virginia
Libraries established in 1818
Libraries on the National Register of Historic Places in Virginia
National Register of Historic Places in Amherst County, Virginia